Christian Michael Leonard Slater (born August 18, 1969) is an American actor and producer. He made his film debut with a leading role in The Legend of Billie Jean (1985) and gained wider recognition for his breakthrough role as Jason "J.D." Dean, a sociopathic high school student, in the satire Heathers (1988). He has received critical acclaim for his title role in the USA Network television series Mr. Robot (2015–2019), for which he earned the Golden Globe Award for Best Supporting Actor – Series, Miniseries or Television Film in 2016, with additional nominations in 2017 and 2018.

Born in New York City to a theatrical family, Slater made his television debut at the age of eight on the ABC soap opera One Life to Live. He attended the Dalton School, the Professional Children's School, and the Fiorello H. LaGuardia High School of Music & Art and Performing Arts. In the 1990s, Slater starred in a number of big-budget films, including Robin Hood: Prince of Thieves (1991), Interview with the Vampire (1994), Broken Arrow (1996), and Hard Rain (1998) as well as cult films like 
Gleaming the Cube (1989), Pump Up the Volume (1990) and True Romance (1993). His other notable films include roles in 3000 Miles to Graceland (2001), Windtalkers (2002), Alone in the Dark (2005), Bobby (2006), Nymphomaniac (2013), King Cobra (2016), The Wife (2017), The Public (2018), and We Can Be Heroes (2020). In addition to his film roles, Slater has also starred in television shows such as My Own Worst Enemy (2008), Breaking In (2011–2012), Mind Games (2012), Dirty John (2020), and Dr. Death (2021).

In addition to his live-action roles, Slater has had an extensive voice-acting career, with roles in FernGully: The Last Rainforest (1992), The Ten Commandments (2007), Igor (2008), and Mune: Guardian of the Moon (2017). He narrated the second season of Prehistoric Planet (2002–2003) and the Discovery Channel documentary miniseries Dinosaur Planet (2003), and voiced the character Slater in Archer (2014–present), Ushari in The Lion Guard (2016–2019), Ren in the Star Wars franchise (2021–present), and Rand Ridley in Inside Job (2021–2022). He has also been the voice of Floyd Lawton / Deadshot in the DC Animated Movie Universe since 2017.

Early life
Slater was born on August 18, 1969, in New York City, the son of Michael Hawkins (born Thomas Knight Slater), an actor also known as Michael Gainsborough; and Mary Jo Slater (née Lawton), an acting agent turned casting executive and producer. He has a maternal half-brother, Ryan Slater, who also became an actor. His great-uncle was radio personality Bill Slater. He attended the Dalton School, the Professional Children's School and the Fiorello H. LaGuardia High School of Music & Art and Performing Arts.

Career

1977–1990: Early success
Slater started acting from an early age. His first television role was at the age of eight on the ABC soap opera One Life to Live. Following a run on Ryan's Hope, he made his Broadway debut as the lisping Winthrop Paroo opposite Dick Van Dyke in the 1980 revival of The Music Man. Additional Broadway credits include Copperfield, Merlin, Macbeth, Side Man, and The Glass Menagerie. In addition he has performed in London's West End in One Flew Over the Cuckoo's Nest and Swimming with Sharks. 

Slater made his big screen debut in 1985's The Legend of Billie Jean, playing Billie Jean's brother Binx. Though expected to be a big hit, the film fell short at the box office. It has gained a cult following. His career improved with his role in The Name of the Rose (1986) alongside Sean Connery. Slater played Connery's apprentice monk while they investigated a series of murders at a Benedictine abbey. Slater followed this by playing Junior Tucker in Francis Ford Coppola's Tucker: The Man and His Dream (1988).

At the age of 18, Slater played the dark character J.D. in the 1988 film Heathers alongside Winona Ryder. Heathers was billed as the teen film of 1989 (the year it was released in the United States). (It was later adapted as a musical in 2014, and was highly successful.) Slater beat out many other actors such as Brad Pitt for the part, and his performance drew comparison with a young Jack Nicholson. Slater also starred in Gleaming the Cube and appeared in Beyond the Stars (both 1989). After Heathers, Slater had offers to play more troubled youths, including as a rebellious teen in Pump Up the Volume (1990) and a wild gunman in Young Guns II (1990), in which Slater acted alongside Emilio Estevez and Kiefer Sutherland.

1991–1999: Box office success
In 1991, Slater was cast as Will Scarlett in the Hollywood big budget production of Robin Hood: Prince of Thieves alongside Kevin Costner, Morgan Freeman and Alan Rickman. The film was a commercial success, taking US$390 million worldwide, and Slater became one of the major A-list stars of the 1990s. With Slater being a big Star Trek fan (in addition to his mother, Mary Jo Slater, serving as the casting director for the film), he accepted a cameo role in Star Trek VI: The Undiscovered Country, shortly after playing Charlie Luciano in the crime drama Mobsters. The following year he expanded his film genre and starred in the comedy Kuffs opposite Milla Jovovich. In 1993, Slater again stretched his acting skills, playing opposite Marisa Tomei in Untamed Heart and playing Clarence Worley in True Romance, written by Quentin Tarantino, which received many rave reviews. In his review of True Romance, Roger Ebert awarded the movie 3 stars out of 4 and said, "the energy and style of the movie are exhilarating. Christian Slater has the kind of cocky recklessness the movie needs."

He gained the role of the interviewer Daniel Molloy in Interview with the Vampire (1994) after the death of his friend River Phoenix, who was originally cast. Slater subsequently donated his earnings from the film to Phoenix's favorite charities. He played the character of Lewis in the romance film Bed of Roses in 1996 opposite Mary Stuart Masterson then that of Riley Hale in the big-budget John Woo film Broken Arrow (1996), which also starred John Travolta. In 1998 Slater appeared in crime movie Hard Rain alongside Morgan Freeman. The same year he also starred in the dark comedy Very Bad Things opposite Cameron Diaz.

2000–present: Television roles, Mr. Robot

Since 2000 Slater has mixed TV work with leading roles in mainly lower budget films, along with supporting roles in a few mainstream productions. He appeared in the successful The West Wing and Alias TV series. He was also part of Hollywood films, including Bobby and 3000 Miles to Graceland. He has also worked as a voice-over artist in productions, including the character of 'Pips' in the successful Australian animated film FernGully: The Last Rainforest, The Adventures of Jimmy Neutron: Boy Genius, and TV documentaries, including Prehistoric Planet and Dinosaur Planet. Slater also voiced the character John Watson a.k.a. "Wonko the Sane" in BBC Radio 4's production of The Hitchhiker's Guide to the Galaxy.

Slater starred in the television series My Own Worst Enemy in 2008 and The Forgotten in 2009. In 2011 he co-starred in the action film The River Murders, with Ray Liotta and Ving Rhames. Also in 2011, he starred in the television series, Breaking In, which ran for two seasons. Slater co-starred with Ving Rhames in the film Soldiers of Fortune (2012), and in the Sylvester Stallone action thriller Bullet to the Head (2013), directed by Walter Hill. He co-starred in the 2014 television series, Mind Games, which was cancelled after five episodes were aired. He was part of the ensemble in Lars von Trier's controversial film, Nymphomaniac.

In October 2014, Slater signed on for his title role in the television series on USA Network Mr. Robot. Slater plays a computer hacker, "Mr. Robot," who recruits Rami Malek's character, Elliot, into Slater's band of hackers called fsociety. The series premiered on June 24, 2015, and concluded in 2019 with its fourth season. For his performance, he earned the Golden Globe Award for Best Supporting Actor – Series, Miniseries or Television Film in 2016, with additional nominations in 2017 and 2018.

Prior to beginning his role in Mr. Robot, Slater announced in 2013 that he was developing and making a film based on Will Viharo's 1993 neo-noir novel Love Stories Are Too Violent for Me, the first of three works to feature Vic Valentine. However, the success of Mr. Robot and contracts for additional seasons has delayed his being able to develop his adaptation.

Slater voices the character "Slater" on the FX original series Archer. He also provided the voice of Ushari the Egyptian Cobra in The Lion Guard. He also made a short film for HP called The Wolf, which shows how easily malware can spread on unprotected printers and computers. In 2018, Christian Slater appeared in The Public, the latest film by Emilio Estevez. At the world premiere of the film at the Toronto Film Festival, Slater discussed his role, Josh Davis, with Ikon London Magazine: 
"He (Josh Davis) is definitely the character in the movie who represents that side of politics where he is not as open-hearted as you'd like him to be. He is definitely the guy who feels this is all a mess. And he is a law and order politician in this movie. So hopefully, he is the kind of guy you love to hate". From 2021 to 2022, he voiced the character Rand Ridley on the adult sci-fi animated sitcom Inside Job. The shows creator announced the cancellation of the show in January 2023.

Personal life
In 2000, Slater married Ryan Haddon, the daughter of model Dayle Haddon. They have two children, a son born in 1999, and a daughter born in 2001. In 2003, Haddon was arrested for assaulting Slater during an argument at a Hard Rock Cafe while on vacation in Las Vegas. Haddon allegedly threw a glass and cut Slater's neck, which required 20 stitches. Haddon was charged with domestic battery, booked at Las Vegas' Clark County Detention Center, and freed after posting bond. They announced their separation over Christmas in 2004. Slater was living in London at the time, performing in a stage version of One Flew Over the Cuckoo's Nest. The couple officially separated in 2005 and divorced in 2007.

On December 2, 2013, Slater married his girlfriend Brittany Lopez in Florida after three years of dating. They have one daughter together, born in August 2019.

Slater practices Kempo Karate and divides his time between Coconut Grove in Miami, Florida and Hell's Kitchen, Manhattan.

Legal issues
Slater has had difficulties with substance abuse and has undergone treatment. In 1989, Slater was arrested for drunk driving. He was sentenced to ten days in jail. At one time he said, "Work is my hobby, staying sober is my job." After living in recovery, he said in 2009, "Work is my job, and having adventures with my kids. My kids are all-important". 
The illusion of being very cool, that drinking is the hip thing to do and that you'll seem like Clark Gable. You go to a party and have a drink and feel like a superhero when the truth is you're looking rather foolish. Showing up for life 24/7 straight and sober can be tough if you're riddled with insecurities. Actually, the fastest way of knowing who you are is to know who you're not.

In 1994, he was arrested when he tried to board a commercial plane with a gun in his baggage. He was sentenced to three days of community service. 

In 1997, Slater was convicted of punching his girlfriend, Michelle Jonas, and assaulting a police officer while under the influence of heroin, cocaine, and alcohol. He had consumed them for two days straight and had little to no sleep. He was treated for more than 100 days in a rehabilitation facility while on bail, and then was sentenced to a three-month term in jail, followed by three months in a residential rehab center. He was released from prison after 59 days on the basis of good behavior. 

On May 24, 2005, Slater was arrested in Manhattan, after allegedly groping a woman on the street. Slater was charged with third-degree sexual abuse. The charges were later dropped due to lack of evidence and on the condition that Slater keep out of trouble for six months.

Philanthropy
Slater has been a supporter of several charities, including 21st Century Leaders, Global Green, and Whatever It Takes. Slater appeared in an educational video on behalf of Nelson Mandela’s 46664 charity for AIDS awareness. He has also worked to promote humanitarian work in South Africa. In early May 2009, Slater visited wounded and recovering soldiers of Walter Reed Army Medical Center for the USO. On December 10, 2009, Slater visited Hattiesburg, Mississippi, where he contributed work for the television show Extreme Makeover: Home Edition. The episode aired on March 21, 2010.

Filmography

Film

Television

Stage

Awards and nominations

References

External links

 Christian Slater's Official Site
 
 
 

1969 births
Living people
20th-century American male actors
21st-century American male actors
American male child actors
American male film actors
American male soap opera actors
American male stage actors
American male television actors
American male voice actors
American people convicted of assault
Best Supporting Actor Golden Globe (television) winners
Dalton School alumni
Male actors from New York City
Male actors from Miami
People from Hell's Kitchen, Manhattan